Michael Montgomery Haddix (born December 27, 1961, in Walnut, Mississippi) is a former professional American football running back for eight seasons in the National Football League for the Philadelphia Eagles and the Green Bay Packers. Philadelphia drafted Haddix in the first round of the 1983 draft primarily due to his 4.5 speed.  Haddix played 8 seasons in the NFL and holds the dubious distinction of having averaged the fewest average yards per carry (3.0) for a player with more than 500 carries in the NFL. He was inducted to the Mississippi State  Hall of Fame in 2019,

Michael Haddix, Jr.

Haddix's son, Michael Haddix, Jr. is a former NCAA basketball player for the Siena College Saints.  In 2007, he received tryouts for the Buffalo Bills and the New York Jets to follow in his father's footsteps and play professional football in the NFL.

References

1961 births
Living people
People from Tippah County, Mississippi
American football fullbacks
Mississippi State Bulldogs football players
Philadelphia Eagles players
Green Bay Packers players